Instant Live: Avalon, Boston, MA 10/17/04 is a live album by Living Colour. It was recorded on the band's 2003-04 tour in support of their studio album Collideøscope. It features excerpts from the show, including several songs off Collideøscope, a few old classics, and the only officially available version of the song "Terrorism".

Track listing

Personnel
 Corey Glover - vocals
 Vernon Reid - guitar
 Doug Wimbish - bass guitar
 Will Calhoun - drums

Living Colour albums
2005 live albums